The 2010 Georgia State Senate elections occurred on November 2, 2010 to elect the members to the Georgia State Senate. All fifty-six seats in the state Senate and all 180 seats in the state House were up for two year terms. The winners of this election cycle served in the 151st Georgia General Assembly.

Retiring incumbent Senators

Democrats
 J.B. Powell (District-23): To run for Commissioner of Agriculture
 Gail Buckner (District-44): To run for Secretary of State of Georgia

Republicans
 Jeff Chapman (District-3): To run for Governor
 John Douglas (District-17): To run for the Georgia Public Service Commission
 Seth Harp (District-29): To run for Insurance Commissioner
 Dan Weber (District-40): Retiring, not seeking other office
 Ralph Hudgens (District-47): To run for Insurance Commissioner
 Preston Smith (District-52): To run for state Attorney General
 Don Thomas (District-54): Retiring, not seeking other office
 Dan Moody (District-56): Retiring, not seeking other office

Incumbents defeated in primary
 John J. Wiles (R-District-37) (elected in 2004) was defeated by Lindsey Tippins

Election results
On election day, one seat changed hands with Republicans winning the seat formerly held by J. B. Powell. Senator Tim Golden's switch to the Republicans would give them an additional seat, though that is not recorded in the table below.

Vacancies (To be filled before November)
All the following special elections occurred on May 11 with runoffs to be held on June 8 if necessary.

Senate
 Senate district 42: Senator David I. Adelman (D) was appointed to serve as United States Ambassador to Singapore and resigned upon being confirmed by the United States Senate.
 Senate district 49: Senator Lee Hawkins (R) resigned to focus on his campaign for the United States House of Representatives in Georgia's 9th congressional district.

See also
 United States elections, 2010
 United States House of Representatives elections in Georgia, 2010
 Georgia elections, 2010
 Georgia gubernatorial election, 2010
 Georgia lieutenant gubernatorial election, 2010
 Georgia Secretary of State election, 2010
 Georgia House of Representatives election, 2010
 Elections in Georgia (U.S. state)

References

External links
 Secretary of State of Georgia elections website - Voter registration information, polling place lookup, and election results.
 Imagine Election - Find out which candidates will appear on your ballot - search by address or zip code.

2010 Georgia (U.S. state) elections
Georgia State Senate elections
Georgia State Senate